Flamingo Bay may refer to:

Places:
 Flamingo Bay, Florida - see List of places in Florida: F
 Flamingo Bay, Grenada, near Molinere Underwater Sculpture Park
 Flamingo Bay, Wadala, Mumbai, India
 Flamingo Bay, New Guinea - see Lorentz River
 Flamingo Bay, an elliptical depression (Carolina Bay)

Other uses:
 Flamingo Bay, a fishing boat acquired and renamed MSA Gunundaal by the Royal Australian Navy
 RV Flamingo Bay, a research vessel which searched for the sunken World War II Japanese submarine I-124
 Flamingo Bay, an exhibit of the Fort Worth Zoo